Ofer Lellouche (born 19 April 1947 in Tunis) is an Israeli painter, sculptor, etcher and video artist.

Biography
Lellouche was born in Tunisia in 1947. He studied mathematics and physics in Paris at Saint Louis College. In 1966, two months before he was scheduled to graduate, he ran away to Kibbutz Yehiam in Israel. In 1968, during his service in the Israel Defense Forces, he contracted hepatitis and began to paint while recovering. He began his formal art training at the Avni Institute of Art and Design in Tel Aviv under the abstract lyrical painter Yehezkiel Streichman. 

He returned to Paris to study with the sculptor César Baldaccini (1921-1998) and earn a master's degree in literature with a thesis on Stéphane Mallarmé. In the late 1970s, he worked in video art and painted self-portraits. During the coming years, he drew and etched self-portraits, often in violent industrial colors.

In 1979, he produced several videos related to the subject of the mirror. In the early 1980s, he began painting landscapes in addition to self-portraits. His 1987 painting Figure in a Landscape" was exhibited at the 19th São Paulo Art Biennial.

In the early 1990s, Lellouche produced more than 600 etchings, illustrated Stéphane Mallarmé's poem, "Un coup de dés jamais n'abolira le hasard", and published the books "Panim" (faces) and "Ein Karem". He also produced large-format paintings, which he called the "Atelier César" in homage to his former teacher.  In 1991, he returned to Paris and visited the location of César's studio, where he found some clay models on their bases and decided to make a series of works that would remind him of what he had seen. Since the late 1990s, he has been engaged primarily in sculpture and etching.

References
 Ofer Lellouche: Self Portrait. Tel Aviv: Gordon Gallery, 1980.
 Omer, Mordechai: Ofer Lellouche: Self-Portrait, 1977-2001. Tel Aviv: Tel Aviv Museum of Art, 2001.
 Restany, Pierre: Ofer Lellouche: The Hand that Thinks. Tel Aviv: Tel Aviv Museum of Art, 2001.
 Lellouche, Ofer: Between Etching and Sculpture. The Open Museum: Industrial Parks Tefen and Omer, 2005.
 Ofer Lellouche: Head II. Tel Aviv: Tel Aviv Museum of Art, 2012.
 Bartos, Ron: Ofer Lellouche: Nine''. Tel Aviv: Zemack Gallery, 2013.

External links
 Official website
 Head For Meina
 Ofer Lellouche Self Portrait on a Transparent Mirror
 Video interview with Ofer Lellouche on Art-in-Process.com (Hebrew, Russian translation)

Israeli Jews
Jewish sculptors
Israeli sculptors
Modern sculptors
Jewish painters
Israeli people of Tunisian-Jewish descent
Israeli printmakers
1947 births
Living people